Nou Mestalla is a partially built football stadium in Valencia, Spain, intended as a replacement for Valencia CF's current stadium, Estadio Mestalla. The basic concrete structure of the stadium was built between August 2007 and February 2009, but work was then halted for financial reasons. The design was revised in 2013 with a reduced capacity.

The stadium architects are Reid Fenwick Asociados and ArupSport, and the cost is estimated between €250 million and €300 million. The design features a futuristic exterior, clad in aluminium and an interior of wood. It is being built on the site of a former factory in the neighbourhood of Benicalap.

History
The plans for the new stadium were unveiled on 10 November 2006, by former president Juan Soler and the club who unveiled details about the stadium and presented a short film about the stadium at the Museu Príncipe Felipe in Valencia. Planned capacity would have been around 80,000.

The work on Nou Mestalla began in August 2007. It was due to be completed in the early summer 2009, in time for the 2009–10 season, but due to financial problems this date was never met.

On 12 December 2011, the club announced that it had negotiated a deal with Bankia to complete the stadium and transfer the old Mestalla property to the bank, and that it expected to complete the stadium in approximately two years, but this deal later collapsed.

On 13 November 2013,  Valencia announced an updated redesign by Fenwick Iribarren Architects. The new design reduced the capacity to 61,500. It also reduced the underground car park and downsized the original design's full roof and elaborate façade. There were also redesigns of the interior decoration. No date was given for when construction would restart. However, the construction was not renewed since then.

On 3 October 2017, Valencia announced they will begin negotiations with Valencia's city council to renew the project and complete the building process of Nou Mestalla.

The stadium will lose 20,000 seats compared to the original design and a modified design. Because of this the likely capacity when opened could be 54,000 seats, 7th largest in Spain instead of 3rd largest when planned.

On 28 December 2021, Anil Murthy introduced to President of the Generalitat Valenciana, Ximo Puig, the new project for finishing the venue. In the new project, the stadium will reduce its capacity to roughly 43,000-50,000 seats.

Accident
On 26 May 2008, four construction workers lost their lives following the collapse of some scaffolding on the Nou Mestalla site. At midday on 28 May, the Unión General de Trabajadores and Workers' Commissions trade unions called a five-minute silence for the tragedy, which was observed throughout the Valencian Community in all sectors of industry.

References

External links
Estadios de España 
Stadium Fan site
World Stadiums
What happened to the Nou Mestalla on Inside Spanish Football

Valencia CF
Football venues in Valencia
Stadiums under construction